Curtis Jeffrey Painter (born June 24, 1985) is a former American football quarterback. He played college football for the Purdue Boilermakers and was drafted by the Indianapolis Colts in the sixth round of the 2009 NFL Draft.

High school career
Curtis Painter was born in Watseka, Illinois. During his freshman year, Painter moved to Vincennes, Indiana, where he attended Lincoln High School and was a PrepStar All-American. During his high school football career, Painter had a three-year record of 28–7 with 4,946 passing yards, 49 passing touchdowns, and 17 rushing touchdowns. He ended his high school career a finalist on the Mr. Football ballot and led his team to an 11–2 record and a conference championship and a sectional championship.

Painter was a 3-star rated Pro-Style Quarterback ranked by rivals.com before committing to play for Purdue University. He also played baseball and basketball for the Alices.

Painter committed to Purdue University on October 8, 2003. Painter was not heavily recruited as he only received FBS scholarship offers from Purdue, Ball State and Indiana.

College career
Painter committed to play for Purdue University on July 28, 2003 under head coach Joe Tiller.  After redshirting in 2004, Painter backed up starting quarterback Brandon Kirsch for the first six games of the 2005 season, ultimately replacing Kirsch as the starter for the last five games of the season. On the season, Painter completed 89 of 170 passes, for 932 yards, with 3 touchdowns and 5 interceptions. Painter became the Boilers' starting quarterback indefinitely after Kirsch left a year early of eligibility.

Painter started in 14 games in his sophomore season, where he threw for 22 touchdowns and rushed for six. He set the Big Ten Conference record in seasonal passing yards, breaking Drew Brees' 3,983 mark with 3,985. His 284.6 passing yards per game ranked seventh in the nation, while leading the conference. He led the Boilermakers to the Champs Sports Bowl, resulting in a 24–7 loss to Maryland.

Starting in every game in his junior season, Painter threw 29 touchdown passes and rushed for 3. He averaged 295.9 yards per game, which was 12th most in the nation, while tying Drew Brees's Big Ten season record with 569 attempts. He threw for six touchdowns, completing 38 of 49 attempts with 348 total yards against Eastern Illinois. In the 2007 Motor City Bowl against Central Michigan, Painter completed 35 of his 54 passes, with three touchdowns and threw for a Motor City Bowl record 546 yards with 540 total yards, which are also school records.

In his last season as the Boilermakers' main starting quarterback, the fifth year senior struggled with the absence of injured running back Jaycen Taylor and the graduation of Dustin Keller and Dorian Bryant. He hurt his throwing shoulder resulting in a 4–8 overall record and only appeared in 10 games with nine starts, while reserve quarterbacks, Justin Siller and Joey Elliot, stepped in his place. His top game on the season came against Indiana in his last collegiate game, where he threw for five touchdowns, while completing 38 of 54 attempts with a total of 448 yards.

Painter received criticism for his inability to win in games against teams ranked in the top 25 polls, which overwhelmed his career record numbers amongst the likes of his predecessors in Kyle Orton and Drew Brees. He started in 41 of the 46 games in which he appeared and went 987 of 1,648 with a total of 11,163 passing yards and threw for 67 touchdowns with 46 interceptions. He was co-captain along with Ryan Baker and Jermaine Guynn for the 2008 football season. He holds a degree in computer graphics technology.

College statistics

Painter's 3,985 passing yards in 2006 are the most in a single season in Purdue history, beating Drew Brees' 3,983 in 1998.

Professional career
Prior to the 2009 NFL Draft, Painter was projected to be drafted in the seventh round by NFLDraftScout.com. He was rated as the thirteenth-best quarterback in the draft.

Indianapolis Colts

Painter was drafted in the sixth round of the 2009 NFL Draft by the Indianapolis Colts. Behind starting quarterback Peyton Manning, Painter was a reserve along with Jim Sorgi. Painter became the second-string quarterback in December 2009 after Sorgi went on injured reserve and Drew Willy was called in as second back-up.  Painter saw no game action as the backup to Manning in 2009 until weeks 16 and 17, when head coach Jim Caldwell decided to rest his starters for the playoffs after clinching the No. 1 seed in the 2010 NFL Playoffs.  Painter made his debut on December 27, 2009, against the New York Jets, throwing an interception and losing a fumble that was returned for a touchdown, resulting in the first loss of the season (after winning the first 14 contests).
He also took the reins during the first quarter the following week in Buffalo, which also resulted in a loss.

Painter was relegated to third-string quarterback for the Colts at the start of the 2011 season when the Colts signed Kerry Collins to take over for Manning after an offseason neck surgery sidelined him.  Painter replaced an injured Collins in Week 3 against the Pittsburgh Steelers. In that game he went 5 for 10 with 60 yards and a fumble.

The following week, Painter started his first NFL game in week 4 of the 2011 season against the Tampa Bay Buccaneers on October 3, 2011.

Painter's first career touchdown pass to Pierre Garçon against the Buccaneers, was the fifth longest touchdown pass in Colts history at 87 yards. Painter made eight starts for the injured Peyton Manning during the 2011 regular season but did not lead the Colts to a victory in any game before being benched in favor of third-string quarterback Dan Orlovsky prior to the December 4, 2011 Week 13 game versus the New England Patriots. He was released after the 2011 season on March 9, 2012.

Baltimore Ravens
The Baltimore Ravens signed Painter on April 19, 2012.   Painter was signed after the Ravens conducted tryout sessions that also included former Ravens draft choice Kyle Boller and former Steelers quarterback Dennis Dixon.  The signing reunited Painter with his former head coach in Indianapolis, Jim Caldwell, who was hired as the Ravens quarterbacks coach on January 30, 2012.

Painter was able to post good numbers against the Atlanta Falcons 3rd team defense during a Thursday night exhibition game.  Painter threw for 3 touchdowns, and nearly 70 yards.
He was still released on August 31, as the Ravens chose to go with the previous year's 6th Round Pick Tyrod Taylor, who had versatility on his side.

New York Giants
On January 4, 2013, Painter signed a reserve contract with the New York Giants. Painter filled in for Eli Manning in the second half of week seventeen against the Washington Redskins after Manning suffered a sprained ankle near the end of the first half. Early in the second half, Painter's pass was intercepted by Reed Doughty. On March 12, 2014, Painter signed an undisclosed contract extension to stay with the franchise. According to the Giants on April 29, 2014, Painter was expected to miss at least four weeks after undergoing arthroscopic surgery on his right knee.
Painter was released by the Giants on August 30, 2014, when Giants' coach Tom Coughlin decided to keep backup quarterback Ryan Nassib as the second string QB behind Eli Manning rather than keeping three QBs.

NFL career statistics

Personal life 
Painter currently resides in Westfield, Indiana with his wife Meg Painter.

References

External links

 New York Giants bio
 Indianapolis Colts bio
 Purdue Boilermakers bio
 

1985 births
Living people
People from Vincennes, Indiana
People from Watseka, Illinois
Players of American football from Indiana
American football quarterbacks
Purdue Boilermakers football players
Indianapolis Colts players
Baltimore Ravens players
New York Giants players